You Me Bullets Love is the first album by The Bombay Royale released in 2012 and was chosen as iTunes Breakthrough World Music Album for 2012. In terms of tracks, the album features "eight originals and two classic Bollywood covers". The title track was featured in the video game Far Cry 4.

Track listing

References

2014 albums